Terry Skrypek is an American retired ice hockey center and coach who won the Division III National Coach of Year in 2005.

Career
Skrypek began his collegiate career at Saint Mary's College, just south east of his home town, and was a key player for the Cardinals over his four-year career. He was twice named to the All-MIAC team and led the team in scoring as a senior while Saint Mary's earned three second-place finishes.

After graduating he immediately jumped into coaching, taking over at the Hill-Murray School. Skrypek built the program into a powerhouse for Minnesota Hockey; in 17 seasons he took his team to 12 state tournaments, ending as runners-up on three occasions and winning the 1983 State Championship. After compiling a record of 325–44–3, Skrypek jumped at the chance to coach collegiate hockey and accepted the job at St. Thomas. The team had been a middling program for most of its history but since the early 80's its profile had been on the ascent. St. Thomas had made three national tournament appearances but failed to make it out of the quarterfinals each season.

For the first decade of his tenure very little changed on the national circuit but the Tommies established themselves as the dominant power of the MIAC, winning 7 consecutive conference titles. In 2000 Skrypek produced the best season in program history, going 27–4–2 and got out of the first round of the NCAA tournament for the first time. The Tommies made their first championship appearance that season but fell 1–2 to Norwich. Five years later the Tommies made their second run in the tournament, again coming up shy, but this time Skrypek was recognized for his accomplishments, receiving the Edward Jeremiah Award for his outstanding coaching performance.

Skrypek retired as a coach following the 2010 season, ending with over 700 victories in both high school and college hockey. He was inducted into the Saint Mary's Athletic Hall of Fame in 2003, and received the Cliff Thompson Award in 2014 for his outstanding contribution to Minnesota Hockey.

Statistics

Regular season and playoffs

College head coaching record

See also
List of college men's ice hockey coaches with 400 wins

References

External links

1948 births
Living people
American ice hockey centers
Ice hockey coaches from Minnesota
Sportspeople from Saint Paul, Minnesota
Saint Mary's Cardinals
St. Thomas (Minnesota) Tommies men's ice hockey coaches
Ice hockey people from Saint Paul, Minnesota